William Williams (June 13, 1932 – June 11, 2013) was an American professional baseball player. He appeared in four Major League Baseball (MLB) games for the 1969 Seattle Pilots. Williams also had an extensive minor league baseball playing career, spanning eighteen seasons from 1952 to 1969.

Playing career
After spending two seasons with the independent Norton Braves of the Mountain State League, Williams signed with the Cleveland Indians as an amateur free agent in 1954. He spent most of his eighteen seasons as an outfielder in the Indians' farm system; however, he also played some first and third base. In 1968, while with the Chicago White Sox’ Triple-A affiliate, the Hawaii Islanders, Williams pitched in one game, striking out two and walking one, while yielding no hits in two innings pitched.

During his brief big league career, Williams made twelve plate appearances, drawing a walk, but not collecting a hit in any of his official at bats. He was also hit by a pitch once, after which he scored his only career run (one out later) on a Tommy Davis single. He was 37 years old when he made his MLB debut.

Coaching
After his playing days, he became owner of Billy Williams' Men's Boutique in Oakland, California.

Williams spent eleven seasons coaching in the Cleveland Indians organization. In 1990 and 1991, he served as an MLB coach under Tribe skipper John McNamara.

From 2000–2004, Williams coached hitting and third base, while also working with outfielders and base runners for the Sioux Falls Canaries. He became hitting coach for the American Association of Independent Professional Baseball's Sioux City Explorers in 2005, serving as interim manager for the last month of the season. Williams’ managerial record was 44–52. In his final season with the Explorers, 2009, he served as bench coach.

References

External links

1932 births
2013 deaths
African-American baseball coaches
African-American baseball players
Baseball players from South Carolina
Burlington Indians players (1958–1964)
Cleveland Indians coaches
Fargo-Moorhead Twins players
Hawaii Islanders players
Jacksonville Suns players
Keokuk Kernels players
Major League Baseball outfielders
Minot Mallards players
Norton Braves players
Portland Beavers players
Reading Indians players
Salt Lake City Bees players
Seattle Angels players
Seattle Pilots players
Sherbrooke Indians players
Toronto Maple Leafs (International League) players
Vancouver Mounties players
People from Newberry, South Carolina
20th-century African-American sportspeople
21st-century African-American people